Steve Pickersgill (born 28 November 1985) is an English former professional rugby league footballer who played in the 2000s and 2010s.

Background
Steve Pickersgill was born in Warrington, Cheshire, England, he is the son of the rugby league  who played in the 1970s for Woolston Rovers ARLFC (in Warrington), and Warrington (Heritage № 742); Roy Pickersgill.

Career
Steve Pickersgill made his début for Warrington Wolves on Friday 11 March 2005, and he played his last match for Warrington Wolves during 2010's Super League XV, he made his début for Widnes Vikings against Gateshead Thunder at Select Security Stadium, Widnes on Saturday 23 May 2009, due to injuries, he retired from rugby league aged 28 during 2014's Super League XIX.

References

External links
Search for "Pickersgill" at warringtonwolves.org
Profile at widnesvikings.co.uk

1985 births
Living people
English rugby league players
Rugby league players from Warrington
Rugby league props
Rugby league second-rows
Warrington Wolves players
Widnes Vikings players